Sahyouni or Sahyounie is literally the Arabic equivalent term for Zionist. It can be also transliterated as Sehyouni or Souhyouni. It may refer to:

Burhan Sahyouni (born 1986), Syrian football player
Daniel Sahyounie, member of the Australian band The Janoskians
Jibrail as-Sahyuni or Gabriel Sionita (1577–1648), Maronite and translator Arabic scholar
Salim Sahyouni, Protestant Evangelical Reverend Minister and Doctor, the head of the National Evangelical Synod of Syria and Lebanon